Sequoia Antrice Holmes (born June 13, 1986) is an American professional basketball player.

UNLV  statistics
Source

Profesional career 
She played in Greece for Panathinaikos during the 2021-22 season.

External links 
 WNBA stats
 UNLV profile

References 

1986 births
Living people
American women's basketball players
Basketball players from Nevada
G.D. Interclube women's basketball players
Guards (basketball)
Houston Comets players
Panathinaikos WBC players
People from North Las Vegas, Nevada
Phoenix Mercury players
San Antonio Stars players
Sportspeople from the Las Vegas Valley
UNLV Lady Rebels basketball players